Matthew Richardson (born 17 April 1999) is an Australian track cyclist. He competed in the men's keirin, individual sprint and team sprint at the 2020 Summer Olympics in Tokyo. His most successful event was the team sprint, where the Australians came fourth.

Early years
Richardson was born in the United Kingdom and moved to Australia for his father's work when he was nine years old. He grew up in Warwick, Western Australia. He loves gymnastics and was particularly good on the balance beam. As a teenager Richardson earned podium results at a national level. After suffering an elbow injury, he turned his interest to cycling.

Achievements
Richardson cycled for the Midland Cycling Club. He was invited to attend a 'come 'n' try' session and was recruited to the Western Australian Institute of Sport.

Three months before the 2019 World Championships, Richardson relocated to South Australia to join Cycling Australia's Podium Potential Academy. This move paid dividends as Richardson was selected to represent Australia in the team sprint. The team finished in sixth position and were edged out of the finals by eventual silver medallists, France.

At the 2020 UCI Track Cycling World Championships, Richardson won a bronze medal in the team sprint with Thomas Cornish and Nathan Hart. It was Australia's highest finish in this event at a World Championships in eight years.

Richardson competed at the 2022 Commonwealth Games, where he won gold medals in the team sprint event alongside Leigh Hoffman and Matthew Glaetzer and in the individual sprint event.

References

External links

Living people
Australian male cyclists
Australian track cyclists
Cyclists at the 2020 Summer Olympics
Olympic cyclists of Australia
1999 births
20th-century Australian people
21st-century Australian people
Cyclists at the 2022 Commonwealth Games
Commonwealth Games gold medallists for Australia
Commonwealth Games medallists in cycling
UCI Track Cycling World Champions (men)
Cyclists from Perth, Western Australia
English emigrants to Australia
Medallists at the 2022 Commonwealth Games